Events in the year 1933 in Belgium.

Incumbents
Monarch – Albert I
Prime Minister – Charles de Broqueville

Events
 20 February – Convention regarding Establishment and Labour signed at Geneva, establishing free movement of labour between Belgium and the Netherlands.

Publications
 Willem Elsschot, Kaas
 Henri Potiron, Treatise on the Accompaniment of Gregorian Chant, translated by Ruth C. Gabain (Tournai, Desclée)
 Georges Simenon, L'Âne Rouge

Art and architecture

Births
 1 February – Raymond van Uytven, historian (died 2018)
 8 August – Myriam Sarachik, experimental physicist (died 2021)
 2 October – Michel Van Aerde, cyclist (died 2020)

Deaths

References

 
1930s in Belgium
Belgium
Years of the 20th century in Belgium
Belgium